Grindstone Creek is a stream in the Greater Toronto and Hamilton Area, Ontario, Canada. It is in the Great Lakes Basin and is a tributary of Lake Ontario at the western end of the lake.

The creek begins Lake Medad in the city of Burlington, Regional Municipality of Halton. It flows west immediately into the unitary city of Hamilton. The creek turns southwest into the community of Waterdown, and flows over the Niagara Escarpment at Boundary Falls. It re-enters Burlington at the community of Aldershot, turns west, and reaches its mouth at Hamilton Harbour on Lake Ontario, adjacent to the Royal Botanical Gardens.

See also
List of rivers of Ontario

References

Rivers of Hamilton, Ontario
Landforms of the Regional Municipality of Halton
Tributaries of Lake Ontario